The 8th constituency of Hérault is a French legislative constituency in the Hérault département.  The 8th and 9th constituencies were
created on 21 January 2010, as part of the 2010 redistricting of French legislative constituencies.

Deputies

Election results

2022

 
 
 
 
 
 
 
 
|-
| colspan="8" bgcolor="#E9E9E9"|
|-

2017

2012

References

8